Vasant Kanya Mahavidyalaya, also known as Vasant Kanya Mahavidyalaya PG college or VKM, is a women's college in Varanasi (India), admitted to the privileges of the Banaras Hindu University. It was established in 1954 by Dr. Rohit Mehta.

History
Vasant Kanya Mahavidyalaya was founded by Dr. Rohit Mehta in 1954. Dr. Mehta was inspired by Dr. Annie Besant and went on to found this college for women education, with the motto Education as Service. The college is run by Besant Education Fellowship and situated in the compound of the Theosophical Society at Kamachha, Bhelupura, Varanasi. VKM is affiliated to Banaras Hindu University.

Courses
The college offers the following courses:

Undergraduate courses in Arts, Economics, Political Science psychology history sociology geography Social Sciences, Home science, Linguistics painting Sanskrit English Hindi philosophy AIHC and Music (BA).
Post graduate courses in Sociology, Home science, English, Hindi, Psychology Political Science, Economics, History, Philosophy, Sanskrit
Doctor of Philosophy.

See also

Benaras Hindu University
List of educational institutions in Varanasi

References

1954 establishments in Uttar Pradesh
Educational institutions established in 1954
Women's universities and colleges in Uttar Pradesh
Universities and colleges in Varanasi